Beo zoo vrt, also known as Vrt dobre nade (The Garden of good hope), is a publicly owned zoo located in Kalemegdan Park, downtown of Belgrade, Serbia. Established on July 12, 1936, it is considered to be one of the oldest public zoos in southeastern Europe. With around 400,000 annual visitors it is also recognized as one of the most popular tourist attractions in Belgrade.

Belgrade zoo officially applied for EAZA membership in 2017.

History
During the Austrian occupation of northern Serbia from 1717 to 1739, they conducted extensive project of rebuilding Belgrade, turning the city into Westernized European, baroque-style town. This period is today referred to as the Baroque Belgrade. The governor in this period, Charles Alexander, Duke of Württemberg, ordered the construction of Württemberg Palace, a massive building used as his seat, which was located at the modern Republic Square area. There, he formed something of the first zoo in Belgrade. He ordered his soldiers to capture and bring to him "wild beasts from the forests and mountains of Serbia", which were then kept in cages. The Austrians withdrew in 1739 and the Ottomans demolished the building in 1743.

The Belgrade's first general urban plan, which was adopted in 1924, envisioned construction of the zoo in Topčider, at the time on the outskirts of the city.

The present Belgrade Zoological Garden was officially opened on 12 July 1936 by the mayor of Belgrade, Vlada Ilić. It quickly became one of the most popular places with the locals and even with the members of the Karađorđević dynasty, who were regulars at the zoo. In the beginning, animals were acquired through personal donations. First group of animals was purchased by mayor Ilić himself while the first manager, Aleksandar Krstić, purchased the first hippopotamus in 1937 to celebrate the birth of his son.

During the Second World War, the zoo was bombed twice, by the Nazis in 1941 and by the Allies in 1944, heavily damaging the infrastructure and killing most of the animals. The zoo also lost seven hectares of land. The 1941 bombing of the zoo was described in Winston Churchill's The Second World War and Emir Kusturica's 1995 film Underground. Miodrag Savković, manager of the zoo during the World War II occupation, was arrested right away by the new Communist authorities, and shot, even though the charges against him nor his resting place are known.

The zoo recovered over time but again faced tough times in the eighties. Animals were neglected and living in bad conditions. In 1984 the zoo received a pair of black rhinoceroses as a gift from the Prime Minister Robert Mugabe and the country of Zimbabwe. Unfortunately, they lived for just a couple of months due to bad care and lack of knowledge about this species. In 1989 Muammar Gaddafi also gave six of his Arabian camels. The government, under the pressure of real estate groups also unsuccessfully tried to appropriate the space to build luxurious hotels, casinos and nightclubs. Belgrade zoo was preserved thanks to efforts from sculptor Vuk Bojović, who served as the zoo's director between May 1, 1986 and his death on September 17, 2014. He received substantial recognition for his work throughout the region. Bojović made various improvements to the living conditions of animals, brought numerous new species to the animal collection - most notably great apes, white tigers, and lions - changed the zoo's bad management, and made it a profitable business.

During the tenure of mayor Dragan Đilas (2008–13), the idea of expanding the zoo to Donji Grad, which it occupied prior to the World War II, resurfaced, but the experts and Bojović himself were against it. The urban plan for the fortress from 1965 already projected the complete relocation of the zoo outside of the fortress, on some of the suburban locations, which in later plans included Veliko Blato, Stepin Lug or Jelezovac. The expansion of the zoo would block the pedestrian pathways between the Danube's and Sava's parts of the fortress, which had been blocked in 1949 but then restored in 2009 with the reconstruction and opening of the Sava Gate. Also, it would prevent the exploration of Donji Grad, which is still largely unexplored and leave the Gate of Charles VI, a masterpiece of Balthasar Neumann, within the zoo itself. By 2017, the zoo had not relocated and the idea of expansion was dropped. There were also ideas to relocate the zoo to the Great War Island, or to the western city outskirts, in Surčin.

In 2022, new city administration headed by mayor Aleksandar Šapić again included relocation of the zoo in the city's urban plan. In February 2023, Šapić announced relocation to the Ada Safari section of Ada Ciganlija island. In turn, this would include relocation of 273 families who live in the area, in the Partizan settlement. The relocation will last for several years. City manager, Miroslav Čučković, explained the relocation: "Since the foundation of the new city administration...we made decisions which are connected to our dedication to spaces to which Belgraders were coming close to in all of these previous years. Those are spaces for which we think should have some new type of content and possibility to directly invest into them". Šapić added that the "political decision was made to handle this", and, if everything goes by the plan, the relocation might be finished in three years.

In order to ease the access to the zoo on an island, city will push the construction of the pedestrian bridge and revitalize the project of gondola lift from New Belgrade to Košutnjak, via Ada. Public and expert's backlash against the project was massive, especially regarding hastiness, arbitration, irrelevance, legality and selected location. Public speculated that the residents of the newly built affluent K-Distrikt residential complex across the zoo are bothered by the smell, or that some more lucrative structures might be built instead of the zoo on such exceptional location. Also, relocation to Ada is not legally founded in any of the city plans or documents.

Šapić then back-pedaled a bit, stating that this is just a "political idea" which is not hastily made, that only now analyses and surveys will be done to check the viability, that nothing will be built instead of the zoo but the fortress will be conserved, and that there is no set time frame for the project. However, residents from Partizan said that they were approached regarding their resettlement already in July 2022 but without any mentioning of the zoo to them, which they consider a proof that the relocation was an ad hoc idea.

Animals and exhibits

Belgrade zoo displays a collection of 210 species of animals, with 800 individuals. One of the zoo's biggest attractions are white lions, which are also the zoo's symbol as the name of Belgrade means "white city". The first pair was received in 2005 from the Kruger National Park, making Belgrade zoo at the time the only one in Europe to exhibit these animals. Since welcoming its first cub in 2008, the zoo has had significant success in breeding white lions. Furthermore, Belgrade zoo obtained a white buffalo from Texas in 2007, and saw its first white calf in 2018. The zoo also holds a pair of white tigers. Belgrade zoo is active in conservation and species-preservation efforts of the endangered local fauna such as griffon vulture, bearded vulture and Balkan lynx. In September 2018, the zoo reintroduced its first griffon vulture to the wild.

Throughout its history, the zoo has had several residents, well known for their scientific importance or for receiving substantial media coverage. Sami the chimpanzee was the first great ape to be displayed at the zoo. he received widespread public attention when he escaped from his cage just a month following his arrival in 1988. After an hour of wandering through Belgrade's downtown streets, Sami was calmed down by the zoo's manager, Vuk Bojović, who then placed him in his personal vehicle and drove him back to his cage. The ape managed to escape again, just two days later, but was this time caught by using a tranquilizer gun. Gabi was a German shepherd that saved her partner, a night guard, from an escaped jaguar in 1987. Though she had been seriously wounded during the fight with the feline, she eventually recovered and continued her night guard duty. Like Sami, Gabi also has a statue at the zoo dedicated to her. American alligator Muja is considered to be the world's oldest specimen of his kind. He was transferred to Belgrade in 1937 as an adult from an undocumented zoo in Germany. Despite the fact that his real age is unknown, certain documents suggest that he was two years old at the time of his arrival. 

Next to exotic animals Belgrade zoo also houses domestic ones, such as alpacas, rabbits and pygmy goats, at the petting zoo, which was reopened in April 2019. The walk-through outdoor exhibit extending over 1000 m2 also features a coffee shop and a children's playground. 

Another prominent exhibit at the zoo is the penguin enclosure, which was constructed in May 2019. It initially displayed seventeen Humboldt penguins which arrived from Vienna and the Emirates. In May 2021, the zoo welcomed its first penguin hatchling.

Selected animal species
Mammals

Red kangaroo
Parma wallaby
Asian elephant
Southern three-banded armadillo
Ring-tailed lemur
Silvery marmoset
Barbary macaque
De Brazza's monkey
Bornean orangutan
Common chimpanzee
Indian crested porcupine
Capybara
Patagonian mara
African lion
Bengal tiger
Cheetah
Eurasian lynx
Jaguar
Jungle cat
Persian leopard
Serval
Binturong
Meerkat
Spotted hyena
Arctic wolf
Coyote
Fennec fox
Asiatic black bear
Cape fur seal
Harbor seal
Honey badger
Oriental small-clawed otter
Pine marten
Raccoon
White-nosed coati
Grant's zebra
Brazilian tapir
Hippopotamus
Alpaca
Bactrian camel
Llama
Fallow deer
Red deer
Reindeer
Reticulated giraffe
American bison
Barbary sheep
Common eland
Dorcas gazelle
Himalayan thar
Muflon
Siberian ibex
Yak

Birds

Ostrich
Rhea
Southern cassowary
Emu
Blue eared pheasant
Elliot's pheasant
Golden pheasant
Himalayan monal
Silver pheasant
Temminck's tragopan
Indian peafowl
Bruce's green pigeon
Crested pigeon
Victoria crowned pigeon
Vulturine guineafowl
Southern screamer
Muscovy duck
Magellan goose
Ruddy shelduck
Greater flamingo
Black crowned crane
Humboldt penguin
Marabou stork
Scarlet ibis
White spoonbill
Silvery-cheeked hornbill
Southern ground hornbill
Trumpeter hornbill
Laughing kookaburra
Black-necked aracari
White-throated toucan
Andean condor
Bearded vulture
Griffon vulture
Egyptian vulture
Steller's sea eagle
White-tailed eagle
Blue-and-yellow macaw
Burrowing parrot
Eclectus parrot
Grey parrot
Lord Derby's parakeet
Red-and-green macaw
Rosy-faced lovebird
Sulphur-crested cockatoo
Yellow-crowned amazon
Pied crow

Reptiles

African spurred tortoise
Hermann's tortoise
Leopard tortoise
Green iguana
Nile monitor
Rock monitor
Boa constrictor
Burmese python 
Corn snake
Green anaconda
Emerald tree boa 
American alligator
Cuban crocodile 
Spectacled caiman

See also
Palić Zoo
Tourism in Serbia

References

External links

 

1936 establishments in Yugoslavia
Buildings and structures in Belgrade
Parks in Belgrade
Tourist attractions in Belgrade
Zoos in Serbia
Zoos established in 1936
Stari Grad, Belgrade